is a  mountain of Ōmine Mountain Range, located on the border of Kurotaki and Kawakami, Nara, Japan. This mountain is on the route of Ōmine Okugakemichi.

Shisuniwa literally means ‘the rock of four “sun” (=13 cm)’. The other names of this mountain are, Mount Yonsun (Yonsuniwa-san) and Mount Moriya (Moriya-dake).

Route 

There are two major routes to the top of this mountain. The most popular route is from Yoshinoyama Station, and it takes four hours and 50 minutes to the top. The other route from Dorokawa, Kawakami via Mount Ōtenjō and it takes five hours 40 minutes.

Access 
 Yoshinoyama Station of Yoshino Ohmine ke-buru Ropeway
 Dorokawa Bus Stop of Nara Kotsu

Gallery

References
 Omine, Daitaka, Odaigahara
 Official Home Page of the Geographical Survey Institute in Japan

Shisuniwa